The 521st Air Mobility Operations Wing (521 AMOW) is part of Air Mobility Command and is stationed at Ramstein Air Base, Germany.  It coordinates logistical air movements into, out of, and through Europe.

The 521st AMOW expedites warfighting and humanitarian efforts by the United States Air Force throughout Europe, the Middle East, and Africa.  It provides all command and control, en route maintenance support and air transportation services for air mobility operations in its area of responsibility. It performs this through aircraft maintenance units, maintenance operations centers, quality assurance, regional training center, fuel cell, aerospace ground equipment, forward supply location, and maintenance recovery teams.  It operates air terminal operations centers, providing passenger and fleet services, cargo processing, special handling, ramp services, and load planning.

The Wing is composed of two groups. These groups are assigned twelve squadrons and fourteen other geographically separated units.

History
The wing was originally constituted as the 555th Signal Aircraft Warning Battalion.  The unit served as an aircraft warning unit in defense of the continental United States from 1942 to 1943.  The battalion moved to England in 1944 where it provided communications support until the day after the Normandy landings when it moved to support the invading forces in France.  It moved frequently to support elements of Ninth Air Force, arriving in Belgium in September and Germany in March 1945.  It continued it mission during the occupation of Germany from 1945. At the end of 1945, the battalion was converted to an Air Corps unit, redesignated the 501st Tactical Control Group and its component companies replaced by Aircraft Control and Warning Squadrons.  It provided radar coverage and navigational aid to allied aircraft flying over the U.S. Zone of Occupied Germany in 1946 and 1947.  It was inactivated in 1947.

The unit was reactivated as the 501st Aircraft Control and Warning Group in 1949 to replace the 7402d Aircraft Control and Warning Group. Between 1949 and 1960, it provided tactical control systems, including aircraft control and warning facilities, passive detection devices and guidance units in central Europe. In 1952, it became a tactical control group again.  In 1954, the group moved to Landstuhl Air Base.  Starting in 1955, it and the 526th Tactical Control Group provided personnel for a provisional Tactical Control Wing, which it replaced as the 501st Tactical Control Wing in 1957 to provide radar and aircraft control for all of Twelfth Air Force. It operated the Tactical Control System to exercise operational control of offensive and defensive units in Europe. In the 1960s, its mission, personnel, and equipment were combined with those of the 86th Fighter-Interceptor Wing, which was redesignated the 86th Air Division (Defense).

Today the two subordinate groups include:
 The 521st Air Mobility Operations Group (Naval Station Rota, Spain)
 725th Air Mobility Squadron (Naval Station Rota, Spain)
 728th Air Mobility Squadron (Incirlik Air Base, Turkey)
 5th Expeditionary Air Mobility Squadron
 8th Expeditionary Air Mobility Squadron
 The 721st Air Mobility Operations Group
 721st Mobility Support Squadron
 721st Aircraft Maintenance Squadron
 724th Air Mobility Squadron
 726th Air Mobility Squadron
 727th Air Mobility Squadron
 721st Aerial Port Squadron

Lineage
 Constituted as the 555th Signal Aircraft Warning Battalion (Separate) on 28 February 1942
 Activated on 4 July 1942
 Redesignated as 555th Signal Aircraft Warning Battalion on 11 March 1943
 Converted from the Signal Corps to the Air Corps and redesignated 501st Tactical Control Group on 31 December 1945
 Inactivated on 25 September 1947
 Redesignated 501st Aircraft Control and Warning Group on 11 May 1949
 Activated on 10 June 1949
 Redesignated 501st Tactical Control Group on 16 March 1952
 Redesignated 501st Tactical Control Wing on 18 December 1957
 Inactivated on 18 November 1960
 Redesignated 521st Tactical Control Wing 31 July 1985 (remained inactive)
 Redesignated 521st Air Mobility Operations Wing on 18 August 2008
 Activated on 4 September 2008

Assignments

 III Fighter Command, 4 July 1942
 Aircraft Warning Unit Training Center, 8 October 1942
 70th Fighter Wing, December 1943
 IX Tactical Air Command, 13 September 1944
 70th Fighter Wing, 22 February 1945
 XXIX Tactical Air Command, 19 July 1945
 70th Fighter Wing, 6 August 1945
 XII Tactical Air Command, 15 November 1945

 51st Troop Carrier Wing, 25 July 1947 – 25 September 1947
 United States Air Forces in Europe, 10 June 1949
 2d Air Division, 10 October 1949
 Twelfth Air Force, 1 August 1951
 United States Air Forces in Europe, 1 January 1957
 Seventeenth Air Force, 15 November 1959 – 18 November 1960
 21st Expeditionary Mobility Task Force, 4 September 2008
 United States Air Force Expeditionary Center, 19 March 2012 – present

Stations

 Drew Field, Florida, 4 July 1942
 Camp Myles Standish, Massachusetts, 20 November 1943 – 28 December 1943 (Port of Embarkation)
 Popham Airfield, England, 7 January 1944
 RAF Boxted (Station 150), England, 2 February 1944
 RAF Ibsley (Station 347), England, 18 April 1944
 Plymouth, England, 19 May 1944 – 6 June 1944
 Vierville-sur-Mer, France, 7 June 1944
 Cricqueville-en-Bessin (A-2), France, 2 July 1944
 Villedieu-les-Poêles, France, 5 August 1944
 Le Teilleul, France, 14 August 1944
 Aillieres, France, 23 August 1944
 Les Loges-en-Josas, France, 31 August 1944
 Paris, France, 4 September 1944
 Ham-sur-Heure-Nalinnes, Belgium, 16 September 1944

 Verviers, Belgium, 26 September 1944
 Gosselies (A-87), Belgium, 18 December 1944
 Verviers, Belgium, 7 January 1945
 Brühl, Germany, 23 March 1945
 Bad Wildungen, Germany, 11 April 1945
 Göttingen, Germany, 12 April 1945
 Nohra, Germany, 26 April 1945
 Fritzlar (Y-86), Germany, 25 June 1945
 Fürstenfeldbruck Air Base (R-72), Germany, 19 July 1945
 Bad Kissingen, Germany, 3 February 1946
 Wiesbaden Air Base (Y-80), 5 July 1947 – 25 September 1947
 Zwingenberg, Germany, 10 June 1949
 Landsberg Air Base (R-54), Germany, 17 July 1945
 Kaiserslautern, Germany, 23 September 1952
 Landstuhl AB (later Ramstein-Landstuhl AB, Ramstein AB, Germany, 17 November 1954 – 18 November 1960
 Ramstein Air Base, Germany, 4 September 2008 – present

Components
Groups
 521st Air Mobility Operations Group, 4 September 2008 – present
 721st Air Mobility Operations Group, 4 September 2008 – present

Squadrons
 3d SHORAN Beacon Squadron, 18 December 1957 – 1 May 1958
 Bremerhaven, Germany
 6th SHORAN Beacon Squadron, 18 December 1957 – 1 May 1958
 601st Tactical Control Squadron (Formed from Company A, 555th Signal Aircraft Warning Battalion, later 601st Aircraft Control & Warning Squadron), 31 December 1945 – 25 September 1947, 10 June 1949 – 18 November 1960 (detached to Tactical Control Wing, Provisional 1955–1957)
 Rothwesten AB, Germany
 602d Tactical Control Squadron (Formed from Company B, 555th Signal Aircraft Warning Battalion, later 602d Aircraft Control & Warning Squadron), 31 December 1945 – 25 September 1947, 10 June 1949 – 18 November 1960 (detached to Tactical Control Wing, Provisional 1955–1957)
 Giebelstadt AB, Germany
 603d Aircraft Control & Warning Squadron (Formed from Company C, 555th Signal Aircraft Warning Battalion, later 603d Tactical Control Squadron, 603d Aircraft Control & Warning Squadron), 31 December 1945 – 25 September 1947, 10 June 1949 – 18 November 1960 (detached to Tactical Control Wing, Provisional 1955–1957)
 Langerkopf, Germany
 604th Tactical Control Squadron (Formed from Company D, 555th Signal Aircraft Warning Battalion, later 604th Aircraft Control & Warning Squadron), 31 December 1945 – 25 September 1947, 10 June 1949 – 18 November 1960 (detached to Tactical Control Wing, Provisional 1955–1957)
 Freising AB, Germany
 615th Aircraft Control & Warning Squadron, Fixed, 18 December 1957 – 18 November 1960
 Schonfeld, Germany
 616th Aircraft Control & Warning Squadron, 18 December 1957 – 18 November 1960
 Ulm, Germany; Turkheim, Germany
 619th Tactical Control Squadron, 18 December 1957 – 18 January 1959
 Birkenfeld, Germany
 807th Tactical Control Squadron, 1 August 1951 – 18 November 1960

Awards
 
 Air Force Outstanding Unit Award
 1 October 2008 – 30 September 2009
 
 American Theater of World War II
 
 European theater of World War II
 Campaigns:

 Normandy
 Northern France
 Ardennes-Alsace

 Central Europe
 Rhineland

 
 World War II Army of Occupation

Notes

Bibliography

  (for designation of airfields in the United Kingdom)
  (for designation of airfields in France, Belgium, and Germany)
  (86th Air Division organization)

Further reading
  (Ninth Air Force operations in Europe)
 

0521
Military units and formations established in 2008